The Minister of Plantation and Commodities, is a minister in the Government of Malaysia, with responsibility for the Ministry of Plantation and Commodities (MPIC).

The incumbent minister is Fadillah Yusof who was appointed by Anwar Ibrahim on 3 December 2022.

List of Ministers of Plantation Industries and Commodities
The following individuals have been appointed as Minister Plantation Industries and Commodities, or any of its precedent titles.

Political Party:

List of ministers of primary industries 
The following individuals have been appointed as Minister of Primary Industries, or any of its precedent titles:

Political Party:

References

Ministry of Primary Industries (Malaysia)
Lists of government ministers of Malaysia
Malaysia
Malaysia
Malaysia